Südheide is a municipality in the district of Celle, in Lower Saxony, Germany. It takes its name from the heathland Südheide. It was formed on 1 January 2015 by the merger of the former municipalities Hermannsburg and Unterlüß.

The villages of Südheide are: Baven, Beckedorf, Bonstorf, Hermannsburg, Lutterloh, Oldendorf, Unterlüß, Weesen.

References

Celle (district)